Upper gastrointestinal bleeding is gastrointestinal bleeding in the upper gastrointestinal tract, commonly defined as bleeding arising from the esophagus, stomach, or duodenum. Blood may be observed in vomit or in altered form as black stool. Depending on the amount of the blood loss, symptoms may include shock.

Upper gastrointestinal bleeding can be caused by peptic ulcers, gastric erosions, esophageal varices, and rarer causes such as gastric cancer. The initial assessment includes measurement of the blood pressure and heart rate, as well as blood tests to determine the hemoglobin.

Significant upper gastrointestinal bleeding is considered a medical emergency. Fluid replacement, as well as blood transfusion, may be required. Endoscopy is recommended within 24 hours and bleeding can be stopped by various techniques. Proton pump inhibitors are often used. Tranexamic acid may also be useful. Procedures (such as TIPS for variceal bleeding) may be used. Recurrent or refractory bleeding may lead to need for surgery, although this has become uncommon as a result of improved endoscopic and medical treatment.

Upper gastrointestinal bleeding affects around 50 to 150 people per 100,000 a year. It represents over 50% of cases of gastrointestinal bleeding. A 1995 UK study found an estimated mortality risk of 11% in those admitted to hospital for gastrointestinal bleeding.

Signs and symptoms
Persons with upper gastrointestinal bleeding often present with hematemesis, coffee ground vomiting, melena, or hematochezia (maroon-coloured stool) if the hemorrhage is severe.  The presentation of bleeding depends on the amount and location of hemorrhage. A person with upper gastrointestinal bleeding may also present with complications of anemia, including chest pain, syncope, fatigue and shortness of breath.

The physical examination performed by the physician concentrates on the following things:
 Vital signs, in order to determine the severity of bleeding and the timing of intervention
 Abdominal and rectal examination, in order to determine possible causes of hemorrhage
 Assessment for portal hypertension and stigmata of chronic liver disease in order to determine if the bleeding is from a variceal source.

Laboratory findings include anemia, coagulopathy, and an elevated BUN-to-creatinine ratio.

Causes

A number of medications increase the risk of bleeding including NSAIDs and SSRIs. SSRIs double the rate of upper gastrointestinal bleeding.

There are many causes for upper gastrointestinal hemorrhage.  Causes are usually anatomically divided into their location in the upper gastrointestinal tract.

People are usually stratified into having either variceal or non-variceal sources of upper gastrointestinal hemorrhage, as the two have different treatment algorithms and prognosis.

The causes for upper gastrointestinal hemorrhage include the following:
 Esophageal causes (gastrorrhagia):
 Esophageal varices
 Esophagitis
 Esophageal cancer
 Esophageal ulcers
 Mallory-Weiss tear
 Gastric causes:
 Gastric ulcer
 Gastric cancer
 Gastritis
 Gastric varices
 Gastric antral vascular ectasia
 Dieulafoy's lesions
 Duodenal causes:
 Duodenal ulcer
 Vascular malformation, including aorto-enteric fistulae. Fistulae are usually secondary to prior vascular surgery and usually occur at the proximal anastomosis at the third or fourth portion of the duodenum where it is retroperitoneal and near the aorta.
 Hematobilia, or bleeding from the biliary tree
 Hemosuccus pancreaticus, or bleeding from the pancreatic duct
 Severe superior mesenteric artery syndrome

Diagnosis

The diagnosis of upper gastrointestinal bleeding is assumed when hematemesis is documented. In the absence of hematemesis, an upper source for gastrointestinal bleeding is likely in the presence of at least two factors among: black stool, age < 50 years, and blood urea nitrogen/creatinine ratio 30 or more. In the absence of these findings, a nasogastric aspirate can be considered to determine the source of bleeding. If the aspirate is positive, an upper gastrointestinal bleed is likely; if the aspirate is negative, the source of a gastrointestinal bleed is probably, but not certainly, lower. The accuracy of the aspirate is improved by using the Gastroccult test.

Diagnostic testing
The strongest predictors of an upper gastrointestinal bleed are black stool, age <50 years, and blood urea nitrogen/creatinine ratio 30 or more.

The nasogastric aspirate can help determine the location of bleeding and thus direct initial diagnostic and treatment plans. Nasogastric aspirate has a sensitivity of 42%, specificity 91%, negative predictive value 64%, positive predictive value 92% and overall accuracy of 66% in differentiating upper gastrointestinal bleeding from bleeding distal to the ligament of Treitz. A positive aspirate is more helpful than a negative aspirate. A smaller study found a sensitivity of 79% and specificity of 55%, somewhat opposite results from Witting.

Determining whether blood is in gastric contents, either vomited or aspirated specimens, is difficult. Slide tests are based on orthotolidine (Hematest reagent tablets and Bili-Labstix) or guaiac (Hemoccult and Gastroccult). Rosenthal found orthotolidine-based tests more sensitive than specific; the Hemoccult test's sensitivity reduced by the acidic environment; and the Gastroccult test be the most accurate. Cuellar found the following results:

Holman used simulated gastric specimens and found the Hemoccult test to have significant problems with non-specificity and false-positive results, whereas the Gastroccult test was very accurate.
Holman found that by 120 seconds after the developer was applied, the Hemoccult test was positive on all control samples.

A scoring system called the Glasgow-Blatchford bleeding score found 16% of people presenting with upper gastrointestinal bleed had Glasgow-Blatchford score of "0", considered low. Among these people there were no deaths or interventions needed and they were able to be effectively treated in an outpatient setting.  

Score is equal to "0" if the following are all present:
 Hemoglobin level >12.9 g/dL (men) or >11.9 g/dL (women)
 Systolic blood pressure >109 mm Hg
 Pulse <100/minute
 Blood urea nitrogen level <18.2 mg/dL
 No melena or syncope
 No past or present liver disease or heart failure

Bayesian calculation
The predictive values cited are based on the prevalences of upper gastrointestinal bleeding in the corresponding studies. A  clinical calculator can be used to generate predictive values for other prevalences.

Treatment 
The initial focus is on resuscitation beginning with airway management and fluid resuscitation using either intravenous fluids and or blood. A number of medications may improve outcomes depending on the source of the bleeding. Proton pump inhibitor medications are often given in the emergent setting before an endoscopy and may reduce the need for an endoscopic haemotstatic treatment. Proton pump inhibitors decrease gastric acid production. There is insufficient evidence to determine if proton pump inhibitors decrease death rates, re-bleeding events, or the need for surgical interventions. After the initial resuscitation has been completed, treatment is instigated to limit the likelihood of re-bleeds and correct any anemia that the bleeding may have caused. Those with a Glasgow Blatchford score less than 2 may not require admission to hospital.

Peptic ulcers
Based on evidence from people with other health problems crystalloid and colloids are believed to be equivalent for peptic ulcer bleeding. In people with a confirmed peptic ulcer, proton pump inhibitors do not reduce death rates, later bleeding events, or need for surgery. They may decrease signs of bleeding at endoscopy however. In those with less severe disease and where endoscopy is rapidly available, they are of less immediate clinical importance. Tranexamic acid might be effective to reduce mortality, but the evidence for this is weak. But the evidence is promising. Somatostatin and octreotide while recommended for variceal bleeding have not been found to be of general use for non-variceal bleeds.

Variceal bleeding
For initial fluid replacement colloids or albumin is preferred in people with cirrhosis. Medications typically includes octreotide or if not available vasopressin and nitroglycerin to reduce portal pressures. This is typically in addition to endoscopic banding or sclerotherapy for the varices. If this is sufficient then beta blockers and nitrates may be used for the prevention of re-bleeding. If bleeding continues then balloon tamponade with a Sengstaken-Blakemore tube or Minnesota tube may be used in an attempt to mechanically compress the varices. This may then be followed by a transjugular intrahepatic portosystemic shunt.

Blood products
If large amounts of pack red blood cells are used additional platelets and fresh frozen plasma should be administered to prevent coagulopathies. Some evidence supports holding off on blood transfusions in those who have a hemoglobin greater than 7 to 8 g/dL and only moderate bleeding. If the INR is greater than 1.5 to 1.8 correction with fresh frozen plasma, prothrombin complex may decrease mortality.

Procedures

The benefits versus risks of placing a nasogastric tube in those with upper gastrointestinal bleeding are not determined. Endoscopy within 24 hours is recommended. Prokinetic agents such as erythromycin before endoscopy can decrease the amount of blood in the stomach and thus improve the operators view. Early endoscopy decreases hospital time and the amount of blood transfusions needed. Proton pump inhibitors, if they have not been started earlier, are recommended in those in whom high risk signs for bleeding are found. It is also recommended that people with high risk signs are kept in hospital for at least 72 hours.
Blood is not recommended to correct anaemia, unless the patient is cardiovascularly unstable as this can worsen outcomes. Oral iron can be used, but this can lead to problems with compliance, tolerance, darkening stools which may mask evidence of rebleeding and tends to be slow, especially if used in conjunction with proton pump inhibitors. Parenteral Iron is increasingly used in these cases to improve patient outcomes and void blood usage.

Prognosis
Depending on its severity, upper gastrointestinal bleeding may carry an estimated mortality risk of 11%. However, survival has improved to about 2 percent, likely as a result of improvements in medical therapy and endoscopic control of bleeding.

Epidemiology
About 75% of people presenting to the emergency department with gastrointestinal bleeding have an upper source. The diagnosis is easier when the people have hematemesis. In the absence of hematemesis, 40% to 50% of people in the emergency department with gastrointestinal bleeding have an upper source.

See also
 Lower gastrointestinal bleeding
 Forrest classification
 Rockall score

References

External links 
 Patient.uk

Bleeding
Gastrointestinal tract disorders
Medical emergencies